The Pointer Sisters is the debut by the Pointer Sisters, released in 1973 on the Blue Thumb label.

History
The album yielded the hits "Yes We Can Can" and "Wang Dang Doodle" and became a success based on word of mouth after heralded performances at The Troubadour in Los Angeles and the Helen Reddy Show. The album peaked at number 13 on the Billboard 200 and reached number three on the R&B albums chart and was certified gold by the Recording Industry Association of America in February 1974.  The album was remastered and issued on CD in 2001 by MCA Records.

Track listing

Personnel 
 Anita Pointer, Ruth Pointer, Bonnie Pointer, June Pointer – vocals
 Tom Salisbury – acoustic piano
 Norman Landsberg – acoustic piano on "Old Songs"
 Willie Fulton – electric guitars
 Ron McClure – acoustic bass, electric bass
 Rod Ellicott – bass on "River Boulevard"
 Gaylord Birch – drums
 Ed Marshall – drums on "Cloudburst" and "Jada"
 The Hoodoo Rhythm Devils – backing band on "Wang Dang Doodle"

Production 
 David Rubinson & Friends, Inc. –producer, mix-down engineer
 Norman Landsberg – associate producer
 Fred Catero – recording engineer, mix-down engineer
 Jeremy Zatkin – recording engineer, mix-down engineer
 George Horne – mastering
 Herb Greene – portraiture, design

Chart positions

Certifications

References

External links
 

1973 debut albums
The Pointer Sisters albums
Albums produced by Dave Rubinson
Albums recorded at Wally Heider Studios
Blue Thumb Records albums